War Dogs is a 2016 American black comedy crime film directed by Todd Phillips and written by Phillips, Jason Smilovic and Stephen Chin, based on a 2011 Rolling Stone article by Guy Lawson, as well as Efraim Diveroli's 2016 memoir Once a Gun Runner as outlined in an ongoing lawsuit. Lawson then wrote a 2015 book, Arms and the Dudes, detailing the story. The film follows two arms dealers, Efraim Diveroli and David Packouz, who receive a U.S. Army contract to supply ammunitions for the Afghan National Army worth approximately $300 million. The film, which has an unreliable narrator, is heavily fictionalized and dramatized, and some of its events, such as the duo driving through Iraq, were either invented or based on other events, such as screenwriter Stephen Chin's own experiences.

The film stars Jonah Hill, Miles Teller, Ana de Armas, and Bradley Cooper, who also co-produced. Filming began on March 2, 2015 in Romania. The film premiered in New York City on August 3, 2016 and was theatrically released by Warner Bros. Pictures on August 19, 2016. It received mixed reviews from critics and grossed $86 million. Hill received a Golden Globe nomination for his performance.

Plot 
In 2005, David Packouz is a massage therapist living in Miami, Florida with his girlfriend Iz. David spends his life savings on high-quality bedsheets to resell to retirement homes, but the venture fails. David runs into his old friend Efraim Diveroli, who has formed his own company, AEY Inc., selling arms to the US government for the ongoing war in Iraq. Iz informs David she is pregnant, and Efraim offers him a job at AEY; although David and Iz vehemently oppose the war, David joins AEY and lies to Iz.

Efraim explains that military equipment orders are posted on a public website, and their job is to bid for small orders ignored by larger contractors but still worth millions. Local businessman Ralph Slutzky provides them funding, under the false belief that AEY only sells arms to protect Israel. David and Efraim land a contract to provide several thousand Beretta pistols to the Iraqi Police in Baghdad, but an Italian embargo blocks the shipment, which is waylaid in Jordan. Failing to deliver the cargo as promised would mean that AEY would be blacklisted from any future contracts. Meanwhile, Iz overhears the true nature of David's business.

David and Efraim fly to Jordan, bribing locals to release the shipment, and are provided with a driver to transport them and the shipment into Iraq. The trio drives through the night, bribing a border patrol and evading armed insurgents, and arrive at the military base, where Captain Santos is impressed that they survived the Triangle of Death; the two are paid handsomely.

AEY secures larger and more lucrative deals, expanding their operation, and David's daughter Ella is born, while Efraim grows more unstable and untrustworthy. The company has a chance at "The Afghan deal", their biggest yet: the US government posts a massive order worth $300 million, which requires 100 million rounds of AK-47 ammunition and would net a $100 million profit. Facing a global shortage of AK-47 ammunition, the duo encounters legendary arms dealer Henry Girard, who has access to massive unused weapon depots in Albania. Needing to dispose of these arsenals—including over 100 million rounds of AK-47 ammunition—in accordance with NATO treaties, and unable to deal directly with the US, Girard offers to make the deal through AEY. Efraim agrees, despite David's discomfort at working with a man on a terrorist watchlist.

The two go to Albania to test the ammunition and win the contract, though Efraim learns they severely underbid their competitors. Iz, frustrated with David's lies, leaves to live with her mother. Preparing the shipment in Albania, David discovers virtually all the rounds are Chinese-made and illegal due to a US embargo; to conceal this, Efraim has the ammunition repackaged. Learning Henry has charged them a 400% markup, Efraim plans to cut him out of the deal, ignoring David's protests and destroying the only copy of his partnership contract with David.

Henry retaliates by having David kidnapped, beaten, and threatened at gunpoint; David learns Efraim did not pay Enver, the Albanian handling the repackaging, the 100,000 USD repackaging fee. Enver reveals that he knows about the true reason of the repackaging and indirectly threatening to rat them out to the US authority, causing David to promise to get Efraim to pay him. He even learns that his Albanian driver, Bashkim, went missing and starts to wonder if he has been killed.

Returning to Miami, David quits AEY and demands the money he is owed, but Efraim refuses. David returns to working as a massage therapist and convinces Iz to move back in with him, telling her the truth about AEY. Weeks later, Efraim and Ralph offer David a paltry severance package, and David threatens Efraim with evidence of his falsified company documents. Shortly after, David and Efraim are arrested by the FBI, who had been contacted by the disgruntled Enver. The FBI had previously arrested Ralph, who wore a wire in an incriminating meeting with David and Efraim. Efraim is sentenced to four years in prison for numerous crimes related to conspiracy and fraud on the Afghan deal, while David pleads guilty and gets seven months' house arrest for his cooperation.

Months later, Henry apologizes to David for abducting him in Albania and shares his appreciation for not being turned in to the FBI. David asks what has happened to Bashkim, the Albanian driver, but Henry does not answer, instead offering David a briefcase of money in exchange for "no more questions." The movie ends, leaving David's decision unclear.

Cast

Production 
Initially, Jesse Eisenberg and Shia LaBeouf were set to star in the film; however, Jonah Hill and Miles Teller were eventually cast. Further casting was announced in early 2015, with Ana de Armas joining in February, and JB Blanc joining in March. Screenwriter Stephen Chin based many of the incidents on his own experiences in Iraq.

Shooting was initially set to begin late April 2015, in Miami, for several weeks. According to SSN Insider, filming began on March 2, 2015. Later confirmed by the Business Wire on March 17, 2015, filming was underway in Romania. On April 29, 2015, Hill and Teller were spotted filming on the set in Burbank, California.

Music 

 "Waters of Nazareth" by Justice
 "Funk #49" by the James Gang
 "They Broke His Pelvis" by Cliff Martinez
 "Don't Fear The Reaper" by Donald Roeser
 "So What'Cha Want" by The Beastie Boys
 "What Up Gangsta" by 50 Cent
 "Fireworks Went Off" by Cliff Martinez, Mac Quayle & Peter Adams
 "Jump Around" by House of Pain
 "Sweet Emotion" by Aerosmith
 "Can Your Monkey Do The Dog" by Rufus Thomas
 "Bojangles" by Pitbull
 "Red Red Wine" by UB40 (originally by Neil Diamond)
 "The Passenger" by Iggy Pop
 "Ashgar Be Shama (Izash Remix) by Ilham al-Madfai
 "Chathab" by Ilham al-Madfai
 "Fortunate Son" by Creedence Clearwater Revival
 "Dimension" by Wolfmother
 "Ooh Las Vegas" by Gram Parsons
 "Ain't That A Kick In The Head" by Dean Martin
 "Girl, You'll Be a Woman Soon" by Neil Diamond
 "The Last Drive Home" by Cliff Martinez & Randy Alan Miller
 "Pushka Kërkon Trima (Rritu Biri i Nënës)" played by Albanian Popular Music Ensemble of Tirana
 "Wish You Were Here" by Pink Floyd
 "What Is Love" by Haddaway
 "You Keep Me Hangin' On" by Vanilla Fudge
 "L'amour est un oiseau rebelle" (by Georges Bizet) sung by Maria Callas and the Orchestre national de France
 "Christmas (Baby Please Come Home)" by Darlene Love
 "Forsythia" by Cliff Martinez
 "Time in a Bottle" by David Young
 "Behind Blue Eyes" by The Who
 "Everybody Knows" by Leonard Cohen

Release 
Warner Bros. originally set the film for a release on March 11, 2016. In November 2015, the release date was moved to August 19, 2016.

Box office
War Dogs grossed $43 million in North America and $43.2 million in other territories for a worldwide total of $86.2 million, against a budget of $40 million.

In the United States and Canada, War Dogs was released on August 19, 2016, alongside Ben-Hur and Kubo and the Two Strings, and was projected to gross $12–15 million from 3,100 theaters in its opening weekend. The film made $1.3 million from its Thursday night previews and $5.5 million on its first day (including previews). It went on to gross $14.3 million in its opening weekend, finishing third at the box office and first among new releases.

Critical response
War Dogs received mixed reviews from critics. On Rotten Tomatoes the film has an approval rating of 61%, based on 235 reviews with an average rating of 6.00/10. The website's critical consensus reads, "War Dogs rises on the strength of Jonah Hill's compelling performance to take a lightly entertaining look at troubling real-world events." On Metacritic, the film has a score of 57 out of 100, based on 41 critics, indicating "mixed or average reviews". Audiences polled by CinemaScore gave the film an average grade of "B" on an A+ to F scale.

ScreenCrush's Matt Singer said, "Superficially, the movie looks a lot like past Phillips comedies about men behaving badly, with dirty jokes and wacky hijinks galore. But War Dogs is more critical of its protagonists' behavior, and there's plenty of sad commentary about the state of modern America."

Ignatiy Vishnevetsky of The A.V. Club had misgivings about the film's slant and biographical omissions, writing: "One might quibble with the way Phillips limits responsibility on the Pentagon deal by painting AEY as better businessmen than they actually were [...], while avoiding the darker sides of the story..." Matt Zoller Seitz of RogerEbert.com gave the film two out of four stars, stating: "War Dogs is a film about horrible people that refuses to own the horribleness."

See also
 2008 Gërdec explosions
 Lord of War (2005): semi-biographical film about an international arms dealer

References

External links 
 
 
 
 

2016 films
2010s biographical films
2010s crime comedy-drama films
2010s war comedy-drama films
2010s buddy comedy films
American biographical films
American buddy comedy films
American business films
American crime comedy-drama films
American war comedy-drama films
2010s war adventure films
Comedy films based on actual events
Crime films based on actual events
Drama films based on actual events
Dune Entertainment films
Films based on newspaper and magazine articles
Films about arms trafficking
Films about businesspeople
Films produced by Bradley Cooper
Films produced by Todd Phillips
Films set in 2005
Films set in 2006
Films set in 2007
Films set in 2008
Films set in Afghanistan
Films set in Iraq
Iraq War films
War in Afghanistan (2001–2021) films
Films set in Albania
Films set in Miami
Films shot in California
Films shot in Florida
Films shot in Los Angeles
Films shot in Miami
Films shot in Romania
War films based on actual events
Films directed by Todd Phillips
Films scored by Cliff Martinez
Films with screenplays by Todd Phillips
Warner Bros. films
2010s English-language films
2010s American films